Erin Sterkenburg (born 20 March 2003) is a South African climber.

Sterkenburg began climbing in 2017 and has since won several national youth championships. At the 2020 African Championships, she was able to win the combination and qualified for the 2020 Summer Olympics in Tokyo.

References

External links
Who Is Erin Sterkenburg? – South Africa’s Olympic Hopeful Has Only Been Climbing Four Years!, Climber News (May 2021)

2003 births
Living people
South African rock climbers
Olympic sport climbers of South Africa
Sport climbers at the 2020 Summer Olympics
Afrikaner people
South African people of Dutch descent
21st-century South African women